Lyle Della-Verde (born 9 January 1995) is an English semi-professional footballer who plays for Enfield Town as a winger.

Early and personal life
Della-Verde was born in Leeds.

Career
After playing for Tottenham Hotspur, Della-Verde signed for Southend United in 2007. He signed for Fulham in mid-2011, turning professional on his 17th birthday in January 2012. He signed on loan for Bristol Rovers in November 2014 for an initial one-month period. The loan was extended in early December 2014, although it was cut short a week later after he suffered an ankle injury.

After being released by Fulham, he signed a two-year contract with Fleetwood Town in July 2015. He was released by Fleetwood in February 2016, signing a one-month contract with Crawley Town later that month. Della-Verde was released by Crawley Town at the end of the 2015–16 season, and signed for non-league Welling United in August 2016. He was released by Welling United on 19 November 2016. On 2 December 2016, he signed for Concord Rangers. He signed for Dartford in June 2017. At the end of the 2017–18 season – after Dartford missed out on promotion back to the National League – Della-Verde left the club.

On 29 June 2018, Della-Verde agreed to join newly promoted National League side Braintree Town. Della-Verde then joined Kingstonian in March 2019. After only two games, he joined Haringey Borough. Della-Verde lined up for Hayes & Yeading United on the opening day of the 2019–20 season. He joined Enfield Town in December 2019. Della-Verde re-joined Welling on dual registration when the Isthmian League season was suspended due to the second national lockdown in England.

Career statistics

References

1995 births
Living people
English footballers
Tottenham Hotspur F.C. players
Southend United F.C. players
Fulham F.C. players
Bristol Rovers F.C. players
Fleetwood Town F.C. players
Crawley Town F.C. players
Welling United F.C. players
Concord Rangers F.C. players
Dartford F.C. players
Braintree Town F.C. players
Kingstonian F.C. players
Haringey Borough F.C. players
Hayes & Yeading United F.C. players
Enfield Town F.C. players
English Football League players
National League (English football) players
Isthmian League players
Southern Football League players
Association football wingers